Magical Power from Mars is an album by Acid Mothers Temple & The Melting Paraiso U.F.O., released in 2003 by Important Records. Three of the tracks, "Ziggy Sitar Dust Raga," "Diamond Doggy Peggy" and "Cosmic Funky Dolly," were originally released by Important Records as separate three-inch CD singles, but were later combined into this album, with the bonus track, "Aladdin Kane."

Track listing

Credits 

Credits, as stated on the Acid Mothers website:

 Cotton Casino - vocal, synthesizer, sitar, beer & cigarette
 Tsuyama Atsushi - monster bass, vocal, bamboo clarinet, turtle guitar, cosmic joke
 Higashi Hiroshi - synthesizer, dancin'king
 Okano - drums, god speed
 Kawabata Makoto - guitar, tambura, direct touching a resister, synthesizer, hammond organ, speed guru

References 

2002 albums
Acid Mothers Temple albums
Important Records albums